The 2019 SpeedyCash.com 400 was a NASCAR Gander Outdoors Truck Series race held on June 7, 2019, at Texas Motor Speedway in Fort Worth, Texas. Contested over 167 laps on the 1.5-mile (2.4 km) intermediate quad-oval, it was the ninth race of the 2019 NASCAR Gander Outdoors Truck Series season.

Background

Track

Texas Motor Speedway is a speedway located in the northernmost portion of the U.S. city of Fort Worth, Texas – the portion located in Denton County, Texas. The track measures  around and is banked 24 degrees in the turns, and is of the oval design, where the front straightaway juts outward slightly. The track layout is similar to Atlanta Motor Speedway and Charlotte Motor Speedway (formerly Lowe's Motor Speedway). The track is owned by Speedway Motorsports, Inc., the same company that owns Atlanta and Charlotte Motor Speedways, as well as the short-track Bristol Motor Speedway.

Entry list
Among the entered drivers was Greg Biffle, the 2000 Truck Series champion. Biffle's previous race was in the 2016 Cup Series. His previous truck race was in the 2004 season.

Practice

First practice

Second practice

Final practice

Qualifying

Qualifying results

Race

Summary
Todd Gilliland started on pole, but lost the lead to Grant Enfinger within 5 laps. Four of the five cautions during stage 1 occurred due to drivers spinning out in Turn 2 and wrecking their trucks. Johnny Sauter avoided the wrecks to win the stage. In stage 2, Sauter made contact with Austin Hill, causing Sauter's truck to back into the wall and accumulate damage.

Gilliland later got loose under Ben Rhodes, backing his truck into the fence. He earned his second DNF of the season, knocking him below the playoff cutline. This would also cause team owner Kyle Busch to deliver critical comments about the performances of the team's full-time drivers, none of which had won a race thus far.

In the final restart with less than 10 laps remaining, Greg Biffle stayed out during pit stops. He was able to conserve fuel and hold off Matt Crafton, winning his first truck race in over 15 years.

Stage Results

Stage One
Laps: 40

Stage Two
Laps: 40

Final Stage Results

Stage Three
Laps: 87

References

SpeedyCash.com 400
NASCAR races at Texas Motor Speedway
2010s in Fort Worth, Texas
SpeedyCash.com 400